Hurricane Klaus was a minimal Atlantic hurricane that dropped heavy rainfall across the Lesser Antilles in October 1990. The eleventh tropical cyclone and sixth hurricane of the 1990 Atlantic hurricane season, Klaus developed from a tropical wave on October 3 a short distance east of Dominica. It drifted northwestward, and quickly intensified to attain hurricane status on October 5. Though its closest approach to the Lesser Antilles was within , the strongest winds remained to its northeast due to strong wind shear, which caused Klaus to steadily weaken. After deteriorating into a tropical depression, Klaus briefly restrengthened over the Bahamas before dissipating on October 9 under the influence of developing tropical storm, Marco.

Heavy rainfall on Saint Lucia destroyed about 15% of its yearly banana crop. Damage was heaviest on Martinique, where seven casualties occurred and 1,500 people were left homeless as the heavy rainfall caused severe flooding on the island, resulting in some landslides. The remnant moisture of Klaus entered the southeastern United States, dropping heavy rainfall and causing four casualties; the same area was affected with more precipitation a few days later by Tropical Storm Marco. Due to the impact Klaus had on Martinique, the name Klaus was retired from the list of tropical cyclone names.

Meteorological history

A tropical wave moved off the coast of Africa on September 27. It tracked westward to the south of a subtropical ridge, becoming convectively active, and a low-level circulation was observed as it passed south of the Cape Verde islands on September 28. The organization of the convection oscillated over the subsequent days, and a few times the system showed signs of developing into a tropical depression. As it approached the Lesser Antilles it organized further, and despite unfavorable upper-level wind shear the system developed into Tropical Depression Thirteen on October 3 while located about /h) east of Dominica. Located in an area of weak steering currents, the depression drifted to the northwest, and about six hours after first developing the cyclone intensified into a tropical storm; the National Hurricane Center designated it with the name Klaus.

At the time the hurricane was forecast to continue tracking to the north-northwest. However, after weakening to a tropical storm on October 6, Klaus turned westward.

Klaus continued tracking just north of the Lesser Antilles, and after continuing to deteriorate from the wind shear, the cyclone weakened to a tropical depression on October 8 to the north of Puerto Rico. A low pressure area to its west over Cuba had been steadily intensifying and building toward the surface, and on October 9 it developed into a tropical depression; the cyclone became the dominant system, eventually becoming Marco, and Klaus dissipated under the influence of the system late on October 9. The remnant moisture continued to the northwest, reaching the coast of South Carolina by October 11.

Preparations
Shortly after Klaus attained tropical storm status early on October 4, a tropical storm warning was issued for the northern Leeward Islands from Saint Martin to Antigua, which was upgraded to a hurricane warning as its quick strengthening became apparent; additionally, the government of France issued a tropical storm warning for Guadeloupe. A hurricane watch was issued for the Virgin Islands, though it was dropped as Klaus began to weaken. In Guadeloupe, officials advised citizens to transport livestock to safer areas, and also to avoid potentially flooded areas. Prior to its arrival, schools were closed in Martinique, Sint Maarten, and Antigua. The VC Bird International Airport was closed during the passage of the hurricane.

Later in its duration, the government of The Bahamas issued a tropical storm warning for the central and later northern Bahamas, though it was discontinued as the cyclone dissipated.
Due to Hurricane Klaus, Space Shuttle Columbia's launch was delayed.

Impact
On Barbados, flooding from the rainfall blocked a few roads and forced a few families to move to safer areas; lightning from the outskirts of the storm left a portion of the island without power. High winds and rainfall affected the island of Saint Lucia, which destroyed about 15% of the nation's banana crop for the year; damage totaled about $1 million (1990 USD).

The rainfall resulted in severe flooding on Martinique, which accrued to almost  in some locations; two sisters drowned near Saint-Joseph after a bridge was washed away. Several landslides were reported on the island. The passage of the cyclone left damaged and power and telephone systems. 750 people evacuated their homes in Le Lamentin due to flooding, and a total of 1,500 residents were left homeless on the island. In all, seven people were killed on the island.

On Dominica, winds from the hurricane damaged power lines and downed trees in the northern portion of the island. High winds on Antigua damaged a few roofs, and also downed communications from two radio networks.

Beach erosion was reported along the east coast, due to persistent easterly winds. In South Carolina, the rainfall caused a dam to burst, killing four people. About two days after the remnants of Klaus entered the southeastern United States, Tropical Storm Marco made landfall on northwestern Florida, dropping more heavy rainfall and causing heavy damage across the region.

Retirement

Due to its impact on Martinique, the government of France requested the retirement of the name Klaus; the World Meteorological Organization retired the name from the list of tropical cyclone names in the following year and replaced it with the name Kyle.

See also

 List of North Carolina hurricanes (1980–1999)
 List of retired Atlantic hurricane names

References

External links
 NHC Klaus Preliminary Report (gif format)
 1990 Monthly Weather Review

1990 Atlantic hurricane season
Category 1 Atlantic hurricanes
Retired Atlantic hurricanes
Hurricanes in the Leeward Islands
Hurricanes in the Windward Islands
Hurricanes in Barbados
Hurricanes in Saint Lucia
Hurricanes in Martinique
Hurricanes in Dominica
Hurricanes in Guadeloupe
Hurricanes in Antigua and Barbuda
Hurricanes in Saint Barthélemy
Hurricanes in Saint Martin (island)
Hurricanes in Anguilla
Hurricanes in the Bahamas
Hurricanes in Florida
Hurricanes in South Carolina
Hurricanes in North Carolina
1990 natural disasters in the United States
1990 in the Caribbean